Lashana Lynch (born 27 November 1987) is a British actress. She is best known for playing the role of Rosaline Capulet in the ABC period drama series Still Star-Crossed (2017), Maria Rambeau in the Marvel Cinematic Universe (MCU) films Captain Marvel (2019) and Doctor Strange in the Multiverse of Madness (2022), MI6 agent Nomi in the James Bond film No Time to Die (2021), and as Izogie  in The Woman King (2022) .

Among her accolades, she won the BAFTA Rising Star Award in 2022.

Early life 
Lashana Lynch was born on 27 November 1987 in Hammersmith, London. She is of Jamaican descent.

She attended Twyford CofE High School and ArtsEd drama school in London.

Career

2010s: Early work
Lynch made her film debut in the 2012 drama film Fast Girls, a production presented at the 2012 Cannes Film Festival. In it, she plays a runner from a British team nominated for the World Athletics Championships. She later co-starred in the BBC television film The 7.39 with David Morrissey, Olivia Colman and Sheridan Smith. On television, she has appeared in Silent Witness and Death in Paradise, and was a regular cast member on the short-lived BBC comedy Crims in 2015.

Also in 2015, she starred opposite Lenny Henry in the title role of the Chichester Festival Theatre production of Educating Rita by Willy Russell, which played in the Minerva Theatre from 18 June to 25 July. The Guardians review described her as "dazzlingly fresh".

In 2016, Lynch was cast as leading character Rosaline Capulet in the American period drama series Still Star-Crossed, produced by Shonda Rhimes. In 2018, she joined the cast of the pilot episode of Y: The Last Man as Agent 355, but was replaced by Ashley Romans in the main series.

In 2019, she played Maria Rambeau in the Marvel Cinematic Universe (MCU) film Captain Marvel. Her character is an Air Force pilot, and the single mother of Monica Rambeau, who grows into an important character in the MCU in her own right. At the same time, she also plays in the British science fiction comedy The Intergalactic Adventures of Max Cloud with Scott Adkins and John Hannah.

2020s: Breakthrough and awards success
In 2020, during the Black Women in Hollywood Awards, she won an award of distinction along with Niecy Nash and Melina Matsoukas.

In 2021, Lynch played Nomi, the new 007 agent, alongside Daniel Craig as the retired 007 agent James Bond, in the James Bond film franchise entry No Time to Die; the change to a woman holding the 007 designation in the franchise drew international headlines.

In 2022, Lynch portrayed an Earth-838 variant of her Maria Rambeau character from Captain Marvel in Doctor Strange in the Multiverse of Madness. On this Earth, Rambeau became Captain Marvel. In 2022, Lynch also played veteran warrior, Izogie, in the historical epic, The Woman King, about the Agojie, the all-female military unit of the Kingdom of Dahomey, one of the most powerful states of Africa in the 18th and 19th centuries.

Philanthropy 
The actress gives her support to the NGO Action Aid UK, an organization that helps women and their children who are in precarious situations due to violence.

Filmography

Film

Television

Accolades 
 2020 Essence Black Women in Hollywood: Award of Honour
 2021 BAFTA Rising Star Award
 2023 Girls on Film Award (shared award for Best Ensemble Acting)

References

External links 
 

Living people
1987 births
BAFTA Rising Star Award winners
Black British actresses
English people of Jamaican descent
English television actresses
English film actresses
21st-century English actresses
People educated at the Arts Educational Schools
People from Hammersmith
Actors from London
Musicians from London
British expatriate actors in the United States